They Shoot Horses, Don't They? was a post punk band from Vancouver, British Columbia, Canada. The band had an eclectic style, combining horns and keyboards with pop and rock rhythms.

History
The band was founded by Nut Brown in 2003. Members included Consuelos and Bruce Dyck.

Their debut album Boo Hoo Hoo Boo was released on the Kill Rock Stars label February 21, 2006; at that time the band had eight members. KRS released Pick Up Sticks on June 5, 2007. Both full-length albums were recorded by Colin Stewart at the Hive, in Burnaby, BC. The self-titled EP was recorded by Jesse Gander, also at the Hive.

They Shoot Horses, Don't They? disbanded in April, 2008.

Keyboardist Chris Alscher (also known as Chris-A-Riffic) has become a regular guest host on CBC Radio 3. Saxophonist Ryan McCormick later played in the band Collapsing Opposites.

Discography

They Shoot Horses (EP) (2004)
 Transmitting
 Hit My Head
 The Farthest Reaching
 Sad Sack

They Shoot Horses Tour EP (EP) (2005)
 Emptyhead
 Hiccup
 Sunlight
 Thank You	
 Grand Idea

Boo Hoo Hoo Boo (2006)
 Emptyhead
 Hiccup
 Sunlight
 Seeds
 The Bugs
 Three
 Concussion
 Big Dot
 Low Life
 Words
 Apple

Pick Up Sticks (2007)

 One Last Final Push (2:54)
 The Guest (3:09)
 A Place Called La (4:05)
 Speck of Dust (4:32)
 That's a Good Question (4:22)
 The Hallway (3:24)
 What is That? (3:21)
 Busted Bell (5:30)
 You Know Me (4:21)
 Wrong Directions (3:00)

References

External links
New Music Canada website
Pitchfork Media review of Boo Hoo Hoo Boo
Pitchfork Media review of Pick Up Sticks
They Shoot Horses, Don't They? at allmusic

Musical groups established in 2003
Musical groups from Vancouver
Canadian indie rock groups
2003 establishments in British Columbia